Bendell is a surname. Notable people with the surname include:

 Don Bendell (born 1947), American writer
Jem Bendell, professor and founder of Deep Adaptation
 Josh Bendell, rock musician
 Marilyn Bendell (1921–2003), American painter

See also
 Bendel (disambiguation)